

Winners of major team competitions 1990–1991

Men

Women

Awards and honors

Professional 
Regular Season MVP 
 Michael Jordan, Chicago Bulls
NBA Finals MVP
 Michael Jordan, Chicago Bulls
Slam Dunk Contest
 Dee Brown, Boston Celtics
Three-point Shootout
 Craig Hodges, Chicago Bulls

Collegiate 
 Men
John R. Wooden Award: Larry Johnson, UNLV
Naismith College Coach of the Year: Randy Ayers, Ohio State
Frances Pomeroy Naismith Award: Keith Jennings, East Tennessee State
Associated Press College Basketball Player of the Year: Shaquille O'Neal, LSU
NCAA basketball tournament Most Outstanding Player: Bobby Hurley, Duke
USBWA National Freshman of the Year: Rodney Rogers, Wake Forest
Associated Press College Basketball Coach of the Year: Randy Ayers, Ohio State
Naismith Outstanding Contribution to Basketball: Clarence "Big House" Gaines
 Women
Naismith College Player of the Year: Dawn Staley, Virginia
Naismith College Coach of the Year: Debbie Ryan, Virginia
Wade Trophy: Daedra Charles, Tennessee
Frances Pomeroy Naismith Award: Shanya Evans, Providence
NCAA basketball tournament Most Outstanding Player: Dawn Staley, Virginia
Basketball Academic All-America Team: Jan Jensen, Drake
Carol Eckman Award: Marian Washington, Kansas

Naismith Memorial Basketball Hall of Fame

Class of 1991:
Nate Archibald
Dave Cowens
Harry Gallatin
Bob Knight

Deaths
 June 9 — Howard Hobson, Hall of Fame college coach (Oregon, Yale) (born 1903)
 July 18 — Joel Eaves, American college coach (Auburn) (born 1914)
 November 2 — Jimmy Hull, College All-American (Ohio State) and 1939 NCAA tournament Most Outstanding Player (born 1917)
 December 17 — Carl Shy, American Olympic gold medalist (1936) (born 1908)

See also
 1991 in sports

References